Stephen Berry (born 14 February 1983) is a perennial candidate in New Zealand national and local politics, running on right-wing positions.

Biography
Berry calls himself a "Manurewa native". He attended St. Annes Primary School. He then attended Manurewa Intermediate and spent year 9 and 10 at James Cook High School, where he played cricket for Weymouth.

He ran as an independent candidate in the 2002 Mount Roskill general election and the 2011 Tāmaki general election. He served as spokesman of minor political party Libertarianz, running for Libertarianz in the 2004 Auckland City mayoral election. He also ran in the 2013 Auckland mayoral election for right-wing group Affordable Auckland, coming third with 13,650 votes.

He was leader of Affordable Auckland and criticised money spent on a private bathroom and dressing room hidden behind a bookcase being built behind Auckland Mayor Len Brown's new office. He called it "highly inappropriate and a really bad look". He demanded Len Brown's donors be made public, following a $273,375.22 donation from the New Auckland Council Trust. He criticised Auckland Transport for $41,500 spent on a party for 1700 staff and family at The Cloud, including entertainment from The X Factor winner Jackie Thomas. He said Auckland Transport wasn't hearing the clear message at the local body elections on responsible spending of ratepayers' money "when they throw enormous parties like this".

With Berry as leader, Affordable Auckland organised a "Stand Down Len Brown" march up Queen Street in February 2014, following Len Brown's sex scandal and a report that found he failed to declare more than $39,000 in free hotel rooms and upgrades. He and spokesman Will Ryan said the march was not so much about Mr Brown's private life as his undeclared activities and poor financial management. The protest attracted 300 people.

In the 2014 New Zealand general election, he ran for ACT in the Upper Harbour electorate and was 6th on the party list. He said "In 21st century New Zealand politics, homosexuality is so acceptable as to hardly be an issue at all." He also ran in the 2016 Auckland mayoral election. At the first Auckland mayoral debate, he said groups such as Auckland 2040 were "neighbourhood busybodies... artificially inflating the cost of property". He pulled out of the race and endorsed centre-right candidate John Palino.

In  the 2017 New Zealand general election, he stood for ACT in the East Coast Bays electorate and was 5th on the party list. He said he would abolish the Rural Urban Boundary and open up space for 600,000 homes to impact the price of housing. He also said he would scrap the Resource Management Act. He served as ACT's 2017 spokesperson for Health and LGBT issues. During the election, he defended hate speech against transgender people as a right. Following these comments, he was booed and laughed at by the audience at an election forum in Wellington, hosted by Rainbow Wellington. He said a colleague had told him it was easier to come out as gay in the ACT Party than it was to come out as an ACT supporter amongst gay friends.

He spoke at the Free Speech Coalition protest in July 2018, following far-right Canadian activists Stefan Molyneux and Lauren Southern being denied an Auckland Council venue and unable to secure a venue for their New Zealand tour. He said "Look the thing about free speech is that we’ve all got that in common. We’ve got different reasons for it being in common."

He ran for ACT in the 2018 Northcote by-election, achieving fourth place. Berry's dream for Northcote was a new six-lane motorway over the harbour at Point Chevalier, revived from a 1972 Ministry of Works plan, to fix the Onewa Road congestion. This would be funded by using $58 billion raised by putting up the age to receive superannuation to 67. This was described by others as a "rather crazy motorway plan" and the "stupidest of stupid ideas". Tackling traffic congestion in Northcote was a priority for Berry in this race.

In the 2020 New Zealand general election, he contested the Pakuranga electorate for ACT and was ninth on the party list, but resigned from running in September 2020, citing "physical exhaustion". He was the only openly gay representative of ACT at the time. He was ninth on the ACT Party list and ACT New Zealand got 10 seats, which means if he had stayed in the race and ACT got the same result, then he would have been elected as Member of Parliament. After resigning as a candidate in the 2020 general election, he has finished with politics and now hosts the Mr Berry Mr Berry show on YouTube, where he shares political commentary and clips from his stand-up comedy routines.

In January 2021, he was permanently suspended from Twitter. This was part of the culling of more than 70,000 "QAnon-related accounts", including President Donald Trump, following the 2021 storming of the United States Capitol. He said he did not approve of what Twitter was doing, but he said Twitter owns the platform and has the right to do as it wishes, even if it's something he disagrees with.

Personal life
Berry is gay and an atheist.  He lives in Forrest Hill on Auckland's North Shore with his husband. He is also a manager for a supermarket chain.

Electoral history

2002 Mount Roskill general election

2004 Auckland City mayoral election

2011 Tāmaki general election

2013 Auckland mayoral election

2013 Auckland local elections (Waitemata and Gulf ward)

2014 Upper Harbour general election

2017 East Coast Bays general election

2018 Northcote by-election

References

External links

Mr Berry Mr Berry website
MrBerryMrBerry on YouTube
 Stephen Berry on Facebook 
 Mr Berry Mr Berry on Facebook 
 Stephen Berry's Guide to Auckland Local Elections on Facebook

1983 births
Living people
21st-century New Zealand politicians
New Zealand libertarians
New Zealand LGBT politicians
ACT New Zealand politicians
Libertarianz politicians
New Zealand atheists
Candidates in the 2017 New Zealand general election
Candidates in the 2020 New Zealand general election
Unsuccessful candidates in the 2002 New Zealand general election
Unsuccessful candidates in the 2011 New Zealand general election
Unsuccessful candidates in the 2014 New Zealand general election
Unsuccessful candidates in the 2017 New Zealand general election
People educated at James Cook High School
People from Auckland
People from Manurewa
Gay politicians